Yeon-woo  is a Korean unisex given name. Its meaning differs based on the hanja used to write each syllable of the name. There are 39 hanja with the reading "yeon" and 41 hanja with the reading "woo" on the South Korean government's official list of hanja which may be registered for use in given names. It is sometimes written as Yeonoo instead of Yeon-Woo.

People with this name include:
Go Yeon-u (died 227), posthumous name Sansang of Goguryeo, tenth ruler of Goguryeo
Cho Yeon-woo (born Cho Jong-wook, 1971), South Korean actor
Kim Yeon-woo (born 1971), South Korean male singer  
Nam Yeon-woo (born 1982), South Korean actor
Jhi Yeon-woo (born 1984), South Korean female bodybuilder
Yeon Woo (singer, born 1981), South Korean female pop singer 

Fictional characters with this name include
Kim/Kwon Yeon-woo, in Kang Full's 2003 webcomic Love Story (and 2008 South Korean film adaptation Hello, Schoolgirl)
Heo Yeon-woo, in 2012 South Korean television series Moon Embracing the Sun adapted from the 2011 novel by Jung Eun-gwol

See also
List of Korean given names

References

Korean unisex given names